Charles Sumner (January 6, 1811March 11, 1874) was an American statesman and United States Senator from Massachusetts. As an academic lawyer and a powerful orator, Sumner was the leader of the anti-slavery forces in the state and a leader of the Radical Republicans in the U.S. Senate during the American Civil War. During Reconstruction, he fought to minimize the power of the ex-Confederates and guarantee equal rights to the freedmen. He fell into a dispute with President Ulysses Grant, a fellow Republican, over the control of Santo Domingo, leading to the stripping of his power in the Senate and his subsequent effort to defeat Grant's re-election.

Sumner changed his political party several times as anti-slavery coalitions rose and fell in the 1830s and 1840s before coalescing in the 1850s as a member of the Republican Party, the affiliation with which he became best known. He devoted his enormous energies to the destruction of what Republicans called the Slave Power, that is, to the ending of the influence over the federal government of Southern slave owners who sought to continue slavery and to expand it into the territories. On May 22, 1856, South Carolina Democratic congressman Preston Brooks beat Sumner nearly to death with a cane on the Senate floor after Sumner delivered an anti-slavery speech, "The Crime Against Kansas." In the speech, Sumner characterized the attacker's first cousin once removed, South Carolina Senator Andrew Butler, as a "Don Quixote" who had chosen "the harlot, slavery" as his mistress. The widely reported episode left Sumner severely injured and both men famous. It was several years before he could return to the Senate; Massachusetts not only refused to replace him, it even re-elected him, leaving his empty desk in the Senate as a reminder of the incident. The episode contributed significantly to the polarization of the country leading up to the Civil War, with the event symbolizing the increasingly vitriolic and violent socio-political atmosphere of the time.

During the war, he was a leader of the Radical Republican faction that criticized President Lincoln for being too moderate on the South. Sumner specialized in foreign affairs and worked closely with Lincoln to ensure that the British and the French refrained from intervening on the side of the Confederacy during the Civil War. As the chief Radical leader in the Senate during Reconstruction, Sumner fought hard to provide equal civil and voting rights for the freedmen on the grounds that "consent of the governed" was a basic principle of American republicanism, and to block ex-Confederates from power so they would not reverse the gains derived from the Union's victory in the Civil War. Sumner, teaming with House leader Thaddeus Stevens, battled Andrew Johnson's reconstruction plans and sought to impose a Radical Republican program on the South. Although Sumner forcefully advocated the annexation of Alaska in the Senate, he was against the annexation of the Dominican Republic, then known by the name of its capital, Santo Domingo. After leading senators to defeat President Ulysses S. Grant's Santo Domingo Treaty in 1870, Sumner broke with Grant and denounced him in such terms that reconciliation was impossible. In 1871, President Grant and his Secretary of State Hamilton Fish retaliated; through Grant's supporters in the Senate, Sumner was deposed as head of the Foreign Relations Committee. Sumner had become convinced that Grant was a corrupt despot and that the success of Reconstruction policies called for new national leadership. Sumner bitterly opposed Grant's re-election by supporting the Liberal Republican candidate Horace Greeley in 1872 and lost his power inside the Republican Party. Less than two years later, he died in office. Sumner was controversial in his time; even the 1960 Pulitzer Prize-winning biography of Sumner by David Herbert Donald described him as an arrogant egoist. Sumner was known for being an ineffective political leader in contrast to his more pragmatic colleague Henry Wilson. Ultimately, Sumner has been remembered positively, with biographer Donald noting his extensive contributions to anti-racism during the Reconstruction era. Many places are named for him.

Early life, education, and law career

Sumner was born on Irving Street in Boston on January 6, 1811. He was the son of Charles Pinckney Sumner, a liberal Harvard-educated lawyer abolitionist and early proponent of racially integrated schools, who shocked 19th-century Boston by opposing anti-miscegenation laws, and was a second cousin of Edwin Vose Sumner.

His father had been born in poverty and his mother, Relief Jacob, shared a similar background and worked as a seamstress prior to her marriage. Sumner's parents were described as exceedingly formal and undemonstrative. His father practiced law and served as Clerk of the Massachusetts House of Representatives from 1806 to 1807 and again 1810 to 1811, but his legal practice was only moderately successful, and throughout Sumner's childhood, his family teetered on the edge of the middle class. In 1825 Charles P. Sumner became Sheriff of Suffolk County, a position he held until his death in 1838. The family attended Trinity Church, but after 1825, they occupied a pew in King's Chapel.

Sumner's father hated slavery and told Sumner that freeing the slaves would "do us no good" unless they were treated equally by society. Sumner was a close associate of William Ellery Channing, an influential Unitarian minister in Boston. Channing believed that human beings had an infinite potential to improve themselves. Expanding on this argument, Sumner concluded that environment had "an important, if not controlling influence" in shaping individuals. By creating a society where "knowledge, virtue and religion" took precedence, "the most forlorn shall grow into forms of unimagined strength and beauty." Moral law, he believed, was as important for governments as it was for individuals, and legal institutions that inhibited one's ability to grow—like slavery or segregation—were evil.

The increased income Charles P. Sumner enjoyed after becoming Sheriff enabled him to afford higher education for his children. Charles Sumner attended the Boston Latin School, where he counted Robert Charles Winthrop, James Freeman Clarke, Samuel Francis Smith, and Wendell Phillips among his closest friends. He attended Harvard College, where he lived in Hollis Hall and was a member of the Porcellian Club. After his 1830 graduation, he attended Harvard Law School where he became a protégé of Joseph Story and became an enthusiast in the study of jurisprudence.

After graduating from law school in 1834, Sumner was admitted to the bar and entered private practice in Boston in partnership with George Stillman Hillard. A visit to Washington decided him against a political career, and he returned to Boston resolved to practice law. He contributed to the quarterly American Jurist and edited Story's court decisions as well as some law texts. From 1836 to 1837, Sumner lectured at Harvard Law School.

Travels in Europe
Sumner traveled to Europe in 1837. He landed at Le Havre and found the cathedral at Rouen striking: "the great lion of the north of France … transcending all that my imagination had pictured." He reached Paris in December, began to study French, and visited the Louvre "with a throb," describing how his ignorance of art made him feel "cabined cribbed, confined" until repeat visits allowed works by Raphael and Leonardo da Vinci to change his understanding: "They touched my mind, untutored as it is, like a rich strain of music." He mastered French in six months and attended lectures at the Sorbonne on subjects ranging from geology to Greek history to criminal law. In his journal for January 20, 1838, he noted that one lecturer "had quite a large audience among whom I noticed two or three blacks, or rather mulattos—two-thirds black perhaps—dressed quite à la mode and having the easy, jaunty air of young men of fashion…." who were "well received" by the other students after the lecture. He continued:

It was there that he decided that the predisposition of Americans to see blacks as inferior was a learned viewpoint. The French had no problem with blacks learning and interacting with others. Therefore, he determined to become an abolitionist upon his return to America.

He joined other Americans who were studying medicine on morning rounds at the city's great hospitals. In the course of three more years, he became fluent in Spanish, German, and Italian, and he met with many of the leading statesmen in Europe. In 1838, Sumner visited Britain, where Lord Brougham declared that he "had never met with any man of Sumner's age of such extensive legal knowledge and natural legal intellect". He returned to the U.S. in 1840.

In 1840, at the age of 29, Sumner returned to Boston to practice law but devoted more time to lecturing at Harvard Law, editing court reports, and contributing to law journals, especially on historical and biographical themes.

Early political career

Sumner developed friendships with several prominent Bostonians, particularly Henry Wadsworth Longfellow, whose house he visited regularly in the 1840s. Longfellow's daughters found his stateliness amusing; he would ceremoniously open doors for the children while saying "In presequas" ("after you") in a sonorous tone.

He was elected a member of the American Antiquarian Society in 1843. He served on the society's board of councilors from 1852 to 1853, and later in life served as the society's secretary of foreign correspondence from 1867 to 1874.

In 1845, he delivered an Independence Day oration on "The True Grandeur of Nations" in Boston. He spoke against the Mexican–American War and made an impassioned appeal for freedom and peace.

He became a sought-after orator for formal occasions. His lofty themes and stately eloquence made a profound impression. His platform presence was imposing. His voice was clear and powerful. His gestures were unconventional and individual, but vigorous and impressive. His literary style was florid, with much detail, allusion, and quotation, often from the Bible as well as the Greeks and Romans. Henry Wadsworth Longfellow wrote that he delivered speeches "like a cannoneer ramming down cartridges", while Sumner himself said that "you might as well look for a joke in the Book of Revelation."

Following the annexation of Texas as a new slave-holding state in 1845, Sumner took an active role in the anti-slavery movement. That same year, Sumner represented the plaintiffs in Roberts v. Boston, a case which challenged the legality of segregation. Arguing before the Massachusetts Supreme Court, Sumner noted that schools for blacks were physically inferior and that segregation bred harmful psychological and sociological effects—arguments that would be made in Brown v. Board of Education over a century later. Sumner lost the case, but the Massachusetts legislature abolished school segregation in 1855.

Sumner worked with Horace Mann to improve the system of public education in Massachusetts. He advocated prison reform. In opposing the Mexican–American War, he considered it a war of aggression but was primarily concerned that captured territories would expand slavery westward. In 1847, Sumner denounced a Boston Representative's vote for the declaration of war against Mexico with such vigor that he became a leader of the Conscience Whigs faction of the Massachusetts Whig Party. He declined to accept their nomination for U.S Representative in 1848. Instead, Sumner helped organize the Free Soil Party, which opposed both the Democrats and the Whigs, who had nominated Zachary Taylor, a slave-owning Southerner, for president. Sumner became chairman of the Massachusetts Free Soil Party's executive committee, a position he used to continue advocating for abolition by attracting anti-slavery Whigs and Democrats into a coalition with the Free Soil movement.

In 1851, Democrats gained control of the Massachusetts state legislature in coalition with the Free Soilers. The Free Soilers named Sumner their choice for U.S. Senator. The Democrats initially opposed him and called for a less radical candidate. The impasse was broken after three months and Sumner was elected by a one-vote majority on April 24, 1851, a victory he credited to Free Soil organizer and colleague Henry Wilson. His election marked a sharp break in Massachusetts politics, as his abolitionist politics contrasted sharply those of his most well-known predecessor in the seat, Daniel Webster, who had been one of the foremost supporters of the Compromise of 1850 and its Fugitive Slave Act.

United States Senate (1851–1874)

Antebellum career
Sumner took his Senate seat in late 1851 as a Free Soil Democrat. For the first few sessions, Sumner did not promote any of his controversial causes. On August 26, 1852, Sumner delivered his first major speech, despite strenuous efforts to dissuade him. This oratorical effort incorporated a popular abolitionist motto: "Freedom National; Slavery Sectional" as its title. In it, Sumner attacked the 1850 Fugitive Slave Act. After his speech, a senator from Alabama urged that there be no reply: "The ravings of a maniac may sometimes be dangerous, but the barking of a puppy never did any harm." Sumner's outspoken opposition to slavery made him few friends in the Senate.

Though the conventions of both major parties had just affirmed the finality of every provision of the Compromise of 1850, including the Fugitive Slave Act, Sumner called for the Act's repeal. For more than three hours he denounced it as a violation of the Constitution, an affront to the public conscience, and an offense against divine law.

The "Crime against Kansas" speech and subsequent beating by Brooks

In 1856, during the "Bleeding Kansas" crisis, Sumner denounced the Kansas–Nebraska Act, and he continued this attack in his "Crime against Kansas" speech on May 19 and 20. The long speech argued for the immediate admission of Kansas as a free state, and went on to denounce the "Slave Power"—the political arm of the slave owners. Their goal, he alleged, was to spread slavery through the free states that had made it illegal. The motivation of the Slave Power, he said, was to rape a virgin territory:

Not in any common lust for power did this uncommon tragedy have its origin. It is the rape of a virgin Territory, compelling it to the hateful embrace of slavery; and it may be clearly traced to a depraved desire for a new Slave State, hideous offspring of such a crime, in the hope of adding to the power of slavery in the National Government.

Afterwards, Sumner verbally attacked authors of the Act, Democratic senators Stephen A. Douglas of Illinois and Andrew Butler of South Carolina. He said:

The senator from South Carolina has read many books of chivalry, and believes himself a chivalrous knight with sentiments of honor and courage. Of course he has chosen a mistress to whom he has made his vows, and who, though ugly to others, is always lovely to him; though polluted in the sight of the world, is chaste in his sight—I mean the harlot, slavery. For her his tongue is always profuse in words. Let her be impeached in character, or any proposition made to shut her out from the extension of her wantonness, and no extravagance of manner or hardihood of assertion is then too great for this senator.

According to Hoffer (2010), "It is also important to note the sexual imagery that recurred throughout the oration, which was neither accidental nor without precedent. Abolitionists routinely accused slaveholders of maintaining slavery so that they could engage in forcible sexual relations with their slaves." Sumner also attacked the honor of South Carolina, having alluded in his speech that the history of the state be "blotted out of existence…" Douglas said to a colleague during the speech that "this damn fool Sumner is going to get himself shot by some other damn fool."

Representative Preston Brooks, Butler's first cousin once removed, was infuriated. He later said that he intended to challenge Sumner to a duel, and consulted on dueling etiquette with fellow South Carolina Representative Laurence M. Keitt, also a pro-slavery Democrat. Keitt told him that dueling was for gentlemen of equal social standing, and that Sumner was no better than a drunkard, due to the supposedly coarse language he had used during his speech. Brooks said that he concluded that since Sumner was no gentleman, it would be more appropriate to beat him with his cane.

Two days later, on the afternoon of May 22, Brooks confronted Sumner as he sat writing at his desk in the almost empty Senate chamber: "Mr. Sumner, I have read your speech twice over carefully. It is a libel on South Carolina, and Mr. Butler, who is a relative of mine." As Sumner began to stand up, Brooks beat Sumner severely on the head before he could reach his feet, using a thick gutta-percha cane with a gold head. Sumner was knocked down and trapped under the heavy desk, which was bolted to the floor, but Brooks continued to strike Sumner until Sumner ripped the desk from the floor. By this time, Sumner was blinded by his own blood, and he staggered up the aisle and collapsed, lapsing into unconsciousness. Brooks beat the motionless Sumner until his cane broke, at which point he continued to strike Sumner with the remaining piece. Several other senators attempted to help Sumner, but were blocked by Keitt, who brandished a pistol and shouted, "Let them be!"

The episode revealed the polarization in America, as Sumner became a martyr in the North and Brooks a hero in the South. Northerners were outraged. The Cincinnati Gazette said, "The South cannot tolerate free speech anywhere, and would stifle it in Washington with the bludgeon and the bowie-knife, as they are now trying to stifle it in Kansas by massacre, rapine, and murder." William Cullen Bryant of the New York Evening Post, asked, "Has it come to this, that we must speak with bated breath in the presence of our Southern masters?… Are we to be chastised as they chastise their slaves? Are we too, slaves, slaves for life, a target for their brutal blows, when we do not comport ourselves to please them?"

The outrage in the North was loud and strong. Thousands attended rallies in support of Sumner in Boston, Albany, Cleveland, Detroit, New Haven, New York, and Providence. More than a million copies of Sumner's speech were distributed. Two weeks after the caning, Ralph Waldo Emerson described the divide the incident represented: "I do not see how a barbarous community and a civilized community can constitute one state. I think we must get rid of slavery, or we must get rid of freedom." Conversely, Brooks was praised by Southern newspapers. The Richmond Enquirer editorialized that Sumner should be caned "every morning," praising the attack as "good in conception, better in execution, and best of all in consequences" and denounced "these vulgar abolitionists in the Senate" who "have been suffered to run too long without collars. They must be lashed into submission." Southerners sent Brooks hundreds of new canes in endorsement of his assault. One was inscribed "Hit him again." Southern lawmakers made rings out of the cane's remains, which they wore on neck chains to show their solidarity with Brooks. Brooks was remembered in Brooksville, Florida, Brooksville, Virginia, and Brooks County, Georgia.

Historian William Gienapp has concluded that Brooks' "assault was of critical importance in transforming the struggling Republican party into a major political force."

Theological and legal scholar William R. Long characterized the speech as "a most rebarbative and vituperative speech on the Senate floor," which "flows with Latin quotations and references to English and Roman history." In his eyes, the speech was "a gauntlet thrown down, a challenge to the 'Slave Power' to admit once and for all that it were encircling the free states with their tentacular grip and gradually siphoning off the breath of democracy-loving citizens."

Absence from the Senate

In addition to the head trauma, Sumner suffered from nightmares, severe headaches, and what is now understood to be post-traumatic stress disorder or "psychic wounds." When he spent months convalescing, his political enemies ridiculed him and accused him of cowardice for not resuming his duties. The Massachusetts General Court re-elected him in November 1856, believing that his vacant chair in the Senate chamber served as a powerful symbol of free speech and resistance to slavery.

When Sumner returned to the Senate in 1857, he was unable to last a day. His doctors advised a sea voyage and "a complete separation from the cares and responsibilities that must beset him at home." He sailed for Europe and immediately found relief. During two months in Paris in the spring of 1857, he renewed friendships, especially with Thomas Gold Appleton, dined out frequently, and attended the opera several nights in a row. His contacts there included Alexis de Tocqueville, poet Alphonse de Lamartine, former French Prime Minister François Guizot, Ivan Turgenev, and Harriet Beecher Stowe. Sumner then toured several countries, including Prussia and Scotland, before returning to Washington where he spent only a few days in the Senate in December. Both then and during several later attempts to return to work, he found himself exhausted just listening to Senate business. He sailed once more for Europe on May 22, 1858, the second anniversary of Brooks' attack.

In Paris, prominent physician Charles-Édouard Brown-Séquard diagnosed Sumner's condition as spinal cord damage that he could treat by burning the skin along the spinal cord. Sumner chose to refuse anesthesia, which was thought to reduce the effectiveness of the procedure. Observers both at the time and since doubt Brown-Séquard's efforts were of value. After spending weeks recovering from these treatments, Sumner resumed his touring, this time traveling as far east as Dresden and Prague and south to Italy twice. In France he visited Brittany and Normandy, as well as Montpellier. He wrote his brother: "If anyone cares to know how I am doing, you can say better and better."

Return to Senate
Sumner returned to the Senate in 1859. When fellow Republicans advised taking a less strident tone than he had years earlier, he answered: "When crime and criminals are thrust before us, they are to be met by all the energies that God has given us by argument, scorn, sarcasm and denunciation." He delivered his first speech following his return on June 4, 1860, during the 1860 presidential election. In "The Barbarism of Slavery", he attacked attempts to depict slavery as a benevolent institution, said it had stifled economic development in the South and that it left slaveholders reliant on "the bludgeon, the revolver, and the bowie-knife". He addressed an anticipated objection on the part of one of his colleagues: "Say, sir, in your madness, that you own the sun, the stars, the moon; but do not say that you own a man, endowed with a soul that shall live immortal, when sun and moon and stars have passed away." Even allies found his language too strong, one calling it "harsh, vindictive, and slightly brutal". He spent the summer rallying the anti-slavery forces and opposing talk of compromise.

Civil War
Following the outbreak of war, Sumner was a member of the Radical Republicans faction. The Radicals primarily advocated the immediate abolition of slavery and the destruction of the Southern planter class. Senate Radicals included Sumner, Zachariah Chandler, and Benjamin Wade. Although like-minded on slavery, the Radicals were loosely organized and disagreed on other issues such as the tariff and currency. After the fall of Fort Sumter in April 1861, Sumner, Chandler and Wade repeatedly visited President Abraham Lincoln at the White House, speaking on slavery and the rebellion.

After the withdrawal of Southern senators, Sumner became chair of the Committee on Foreign Relations in March 1861. As chair, Sumner renewed his efforts for diplomatic recognition of Haiti. Haiti had sought recognition since winning independence in 1804 but faced opposition from Southern senators. In their absence, the United States recognized Haiti in 1862.

Slave emancipation

Although the Radicals desired the immediate emancipation of slaves and persistently lobbied for it as wartime policy, President Lincoln was initially resistant, since the Union slave states Delaware, Maryland, Kentucky, and Missouri would be encouraged to join the Confederacy. Lincoln instead adopted a plan for gradual emancipation and compensation to slavers, but consulted with Sumner frequently. Despite their disagreements, Lincoln described Sumner as "my idea of a bishop" and consulted him as an embodiment of the conscience of the American people.

In May 1861, Sumner counseled Lincoln to make emancipation the primary objective of the war. He believed that military necessity would eventually force Lincoln's hand and that emancipation would give the Union higher moral standing, which would keep Britain from entering the Civil War on the side of the Confederacy. As an intermediate measure, the Radicals passed two Confiscation Acts in 1861 and 1862 which allowed the Union military to emancipate confiscated slaves who had been impressed into service by the Confederate military. On January 1, 1863, President Lincoln issued the Emancipation Proclamation.

In October 1861, at the Massachusetts Republican Convention in Worcester, Sumner openly expressed his belief that the war's sole cause was slavery and the primary objective of the Union government was the end of slavery. Sumner argued that Lincoln could command the Union Army to emancipate slaves under color of martial law. In the conservative press, Sumner's speech was denounced as incendiary. Conservative Massachusetts newspapers editorialized that he was mentally ill and a "candidate for the insane asylum," but the Free Soil faction of the Republican Party fully endorsed Sumner's speech. Sumner continued to advance his argument publicly.

Gilbert Osofsky argues that Sumner saw the war as a "death struggle" between "two mutually contradictory civilizations," and his solution was "to 'civilize' and 'Americanize' the South" by conquest, then forcibly mold it into a society defined in Northern terms, as an idealized version of New England.

Joint Committee on the Conduct of the War
In October 1861, the Union suffered a major defeat at the Battle of Ball's Bluff. Senator Edward D. Baker, a close friend of President Lincoln who served as Colonel, was killed. After the defeat, Radical Senator Zachariah Chandler pressed for formation of the United States Congress Joint Committee on the Conduct of the War to investigate the loyalty and conduct of Union officers, particularly Brigadier General Charles P. Stone, who was blamed for the defeat. Upon learning that Stone had ordered two runaway slaves to be denied asylum in the Union Army, Sumner castigated him in a Senate speech. Stone wrote Sumner a terse letter and demanded satisfaction. On January 31, 1862, Stone defended himself in front of the  committee. On February 8, Stone was imprisoned for 189 days on suspicion of treason before being released without explanation or apology.

Trent Affair

On November 8, 1861, the Union naval ship  intercepted the British steamer  two Confederate diplomats aboard, James M. Mason and John Slidell, placed into port custody. The Northern people and press favored the capture, but there was concern that the British would use this as grounds to go to war with the United States. In response to the capture, the British government dispatched 8,000 British troops to the Canadian border and sought to strengthen the British fleet. 

Secretary of State William Seward believed Mason and Slidell were contraband of war, but Sumner believed that the men did not qualify as war contraband because they were unarmed. He argued that their release with an apology by the United States government was appropriate. In the Senate, Sumner suppressed open debate in order to save Lincoln's administration from embarrassment. On December 25, 1861, at Lincoln's invitation, Sumner addressed the cabinet. He read letters from prominent British political figures including Richard Cobden, John Bright, William Ewart Gladstone, and the Duke of Argyll as evidence of political sentiment in Britain.  supported the envoys' return to the British. Lincoln quietly but reluctantly ordered the release of the Confederate captives to British custody and apologized for their capture. After the Trent affair, Sumner's reputation improved among conservative Northerners.

Objection to Taney memorial
In February 1865, there was considerable debate over the creation of a memorial to the late Chief Justice Roger Taney. Sumner, a longtime enemy of Taney, opposed the memorial. In a debate with Senator Lyman Trumbull, Sumner stated:

The work was ultimately commissioned over Sumner's objection. Horatio Stone created a marble bust of Taney, which is displayed in the Old Supreme Court Chamber.

Reconstruction and Civil rights

Throughout the war, Sumner had been the special champion of blacks, being the most vigorous advocate of emancipation, of enlisting blacks in the Union Army, and of the establishment of the Freedmen's Bureau. As one of the Radical Republican leaders in the post-war Senate, Sumner fought to provide equal civil and voting rights for the freedmen on the grounds that "consent of the governed" was a basic principle of American republicanism and in order to keep ex-Confederates from gaining political offices and undoing the North's victory in the Civil War.

The Reconstruction Era of the United States after the American Civil War was in the nineteenth and early twentieth century usually viewed as an era of Southern exploitation and corruption by Northern politicians and harsh federal policies, led by the Radical Republicans. The plight of the freedmen during Reconstruction was largely ignored by conservative historians who followed the Dunning School. According to historian Eric Foner, during the 1960s, revisionist historians have reinterpreted Reconstruction "in the light of changed attitudes toward the place of blacks within American society." Charles Sumner, a Radical Republican, has emerged as an idealist and a champion for African American civil rights through this turbulent and controversial period of United States History. Sumner joined his fellow Republicans in overriding President Johnson's vetoes and imposed some of their views, though Sumner's most radical ideas were not implemented. Senator Sumner, however, in late 1866 favored impartial suffrage for African Americans, desiring to put in a literacy requirement on all southerners in order to vote. Had Sumner's literacy clause been enacted, only a small portion of blacks would have been able to vote, which would have been far more than Congress or the white southern governments were prepared to enact at that time. When Congress did open the vote to all loyal adult males in the South the following year, Sumner was strongly supportive.

Sumner's radical theory of Reconstruction proposed that nothing beyond the confines of the Constitution restricted the Congress in determining how to treat the eleven defeated states, but that even that document had to be read in light of the Declaration of Independence, which he saw as an essential part of fundamental law. Not going as far as Thaddeus Stevens in seeing the seceded states as "conquered provinces," he nonetheless argued that by declaring secession, they had committed felo de se (state suicide) and could now be turned into territories that should be prepared for statehood, under conditions set by the national government. He objected to Lincoln's and later Andrew Johnson's more lenient Reconstruction policies as ungenerous to the former slaves, inadequate in their guarantees of equal rights, and an encroachment upon the powers of Congress. When Andrew Johnson was impeached, Sumner voted for conviction at his impeachment trial. He was only sorry that he had to vote on each article of impeachment, for as he said, he would have rather voted, "Guilty of all, and infinitely more."

Sumner was a friend of Samuel Gridley Howe and a guiding force for the American Freedmen's Inquiry Commission, started in 1863. He was one of the most prominent advocates for suffrage for blacks, along with free homesteads and free public schools. His uncompromising attitude did not endear him to moderates and his arrogance and inflexibility often inhibited his effectiveness as a legislator. He was largely excluded from work on the Thirteenth Amendment, in part because he did not get along with Illinois Senator Lyman Trumbull, who chaired the Senate Judiciary Committee and did much of the work on it. Sumner introduced an alternative amendment that combined the Thirteenth Amendment with elements of the Fourteenth Amendment. It would have abolished slavery and declared that "all people are equal before the law." During Reconstruction, he often attacked civil rights legislation as inadequate and fought for legislation to give land to freed slaves and to mandate education for all, regardless of race, in the South. He viewed segregation and slavery as two sides of the same coin. He introduced a civil rights bill in 1872 to mandate equal accommodation in all public places and required suits brought under the bill to be argued in the federal courts. The bill failed, but Sumner revived it in the next Congress, and on his deathbed begged visitors to see that it did not fail.

Sumner repeatedly tried to remove the word "white" from naturalization laws. He introduced bills to that effect in 1868 and 1869, but neither came to a vote. On July 2, 1870, Sumner moved to amend a pending bill in a way that would strike the word "white" wherever in all Congressional acts pertaining to naturalization of immigrants. On July 4, 1870, he said: "Senators undertake to disturb us … by reminding us of the possibility of large numbers swarming from China; but the answer to all this is very obvious and very simple. If the Chinese come here, they will come for citizenship or merely for labor. If they come for citizenship, then in this desire do they give a pledge of loyalty to our institutions; and where is the peril in such vows? They are peaceful and industrious; how can their citizenship be the occasion of solicitude?" He accused legislators promoting anti-Chinese legislation of betraying the principles of the Declaration of Independence: "Worse than any heathen or pagan abroad are those in our midst who are false to our institutions." Sumner's bill failed, and from 1870 to 1943, and in some cases as late as 1952, Chinese and other Asians were ineligible for naturalized U.S. citizenship.
Sumner remained a champion of civil rights for blacks. He co-authored the Civil Rights Act of 1875 with John Mercer Langston and introduced the bill in the Senate on May 13, 1870. The bill was passed a year after his death by Congress in February 1875 and signed into law by President Ulysses S. Grant on March 1, 1875. It was the last civil rights legislation for 82 years until the passage of the Civil Rights Act of 1957. The Supreme Court ruled it unconstitutional in 1883 when it decided a group of cases known as the Civil Rights Cases.

Alaska annexation
Throughout March 1867, Sec. William H. Seward and Russian representative Edouard de Stoeckl met in Washington, D.C., and negotiated a treaty for the annexation and sale of the Russian American territory of Alaska to the United States for $7,200,000. President Johnson submitted the treaty to Congress for ratification with Sumner's approval and on April 9, his foreign relations committee approved and sent the treaty to the Senate. In a 3-hour speech, Sumner spoke in favor of the treaty on the Senate floor, describing in detail Alaska's imperial history, natural resources, population, and climate. Sumner wanted to block British expansion from Canada, arguing that Alaska was geographically and financially strategic, especially for the Pacific Coast States. He said Alaska would increase America's borders, spread republican institutions, and represent an act of friendship with Russia. The treaty won its needed two-thirds majority by one vote.

The 1867 treaty neither formally recognized, categorized, nor compensated any native Alaskan Eskimos or Indians; only referring to them as "uncivilized tribes" under the control of Congress. By federal law, Native Alaskan tribes, including the Inuit, the Aleut, and the Athabascan, were entitled to only land that they inhabited. According to treaty, native Alaskan tribes were excluded from United States citizenship. However, citizenship was available to Russian residents. Creoles, persons of Russian and Indian descent, were considered Russian. Sumner stated the new territory be called by its Aleutian name Alaska meaning "great land." Sumner advocated for U.S. citizens of Alaska free public education and equal protection laws.

Personal achievements in 1867 included his election as a member to the American Philosophical Society.

CSS Alabama claims

Sumner was well regarded in the United Kingdom, but after the war he sacrificed his reputation in the U.K. by his stand on U.S. claims for British breaches of neutrality. The U.S. had claims against Britain for the damage inflicted by Confederate raiding ships fitted out in British ports. Sumner held that since Britain had accorded the rights of belligerents to the Confederacy, it was responsible for extending the duration of the war and consequent losses. In 1869, he asserted that Britain should pay damages for not merely the raiders, but also "that other damage, immense and infinite, caused by the prolongation of the war", specifically the British blockade runners, which estimated to have provided the Confederacy 60% of its weapons, 1/3 of the lead for its bullets, 3/4 ingredients for its powder, and most of the cloth for its uniforms; such act lengthened the Civil War by two years and cost 400,000 more lives of soldiers and civilians on both sides.  He demanded $2,000,000,000 for these "national claims" in addition to $125,000,000 for damages from the raiders. Sumner did not expect that Britain ever would or could pay this immense sum, but he suggested that Britain turn over Canada as payment. This proposition offended many Britons, though it was taken seriously by many Americans, including the Secretary of State, whose support for them nearly derailed the settlement with Great Britain in the months before the arbitration conference met at Geneva. At the Geneva arbitration conference in 1871, which settled U.S. claims against Britain, the panel of arbitrators refused to consider those "national claims."

Sumner had some influence over J. Lothrop Motley, the U.S. ambassador to Britain, causing him to disregard the instructions of Secretary of State Hamilton Fish on the matter, though not as far as some historians have indicated. This offended President Grant, but while it would be given as the official reason for Motley's removal, was not really so pressing: the dismissal took place a year after Motley's alleged misbehavior, and the real reason was an act of spite by the president against Sumner.

Dominican Republic annexation treaty

In 1869, President Grant, in an expansionist plan, looked into the annexation of a Caribbean island country, the Dominican Republic, then known as Santo Domingo. Grant believed that the mineral resources on the island would be valuable to the United States, and that African Americans repressed in the South would have a safe haven to which to migrate. A labor shortage in the South would force Southerners to be tolerant towards African Americans. In July and November 1869, under authority of President Grant and permission by the State Department on the second trip, Orville Babcock, private secretary to President Grant, secretly negotiated a treaty with President Buenaventura Báez, President of the Dominican Republic. The initial treaty by Babcock had not been authorized by the State Department. The island nation, however, was on the verge of a civil war between President Báez and ex-President Marcos A. Cabral. President Grant sent in the U.S. Navy to keep the Dominican Republic free from invasion and civil war while the treaty negotiations took place. This military action was controversial since the naval protection was unauthorized by the U.S. Congress. The official treaty, drafted by Secretary of State Hamilton Fish in October 1869, annexed the Dominican Republic to the United States, gave eventual statehood, the lease of Samaná Bay for $150,000 yearly, and a $1,500,000 payment of the Dominican national debt. In January 1870, in order to gain support for the treaty, President Grant visited Sen. Sumner's Washington home and mistakenly believed that Sumner had given consent for the treaty. Sen. Sumner stated that he had only promised to give the treaty friendly consideration. This meeting would later lead to bitter contention between Sumner and Grant. The treaty was formally submitted to the United States Senate on January 10, 1870.

Sumner, opposed to American imperialism in the Caribbean and fearful that annexation would lead to the conquest of the neighboring black republic of Haiti, became convinced that corruption lay behind the treaty, and that men close to the president shared in the corruption. As chairman of the Senate Foreign Relations Committee, Sumner initially withheld his opinion on the treaty on January 18, 1870. Sumner had been leaked information from Assistant Secretary of State, Bancroft Davis, that U.S. Naval ships were being used to protect Báez. Sumner's committee voted against annexation and at Sumner's suggestion and quite possibly to save the party from an ugly fight or the president from embarrassment, the Senate held its debate of the treaty behind closed doors in executive session. Grant persisted and sent messages to Congress in favor of annexation on March 14, 1870, and May 31, 1870. In closed session, Sumner spoke out against the treaty; warning that there would be difficulty with the foreign nationals, noting the chronic rebellion that took place on the island, and the risk that the independence of Haiti, recognized by the United States in 1862, would be lost. Sumner stated that Grant's use of the U.S. Navy as a protectorate was a violation of International law and unconstitutional. Finally, on June 30, 1870 the treaty was voted on by the Senate and failed to gain the required 2/3 majority for treaty passage.

The following day, Grant, feeling betrayed by Sumner, retaliated by ordering the dismissal of Sumner's close friend John Lothrop Motley, Ambassador to Britain. By autumn, Sumner's personal hostility to the president was public knowledge, and he blamed the Secretary of State for failing to have resigned, rather than let Grant have his way. The two men, friends until then, cooled into bitter enemies. In December 1870, still fearful that Grant meant to acquire Santo Domingo somehow, Sumner gave a fiercely critical speech accusing the president of usurpation and Babcock of unethical conduct. Already Grant, supported by Fish, had initiated a campaign to depose Sumner from the chairmanship of the Senate Foreign Relations Committee. Although Sumner stated he was an "Administration man," in addition to having stopped Grant's Dominican Republic treaty attempt, Sumner had defeated Grant's full repeal of the Tenure of Office Act, blocked Grant's nomination of Alexander Stewart as U.S. Secretary of Treasury, and been a constant harassing force pushing Reconstruction policies faster than Grant had been willing to go. Grant resented Sumner's superiority of manner, as well. Told once that Sumner did not believe in the Bible, the president is supposed to have said that he was not surprised: "He didn't write it." As the rift between Grant and Sumner increased, Sumner's health began to decline. When the 42nd U.S. Congress convened on March 4, 1871, senators affiliated with President Grant, known as "New Radicals" voted to oust Sumner from the Senate Foreign Relations Committee chairmanship.

Liberal Republican revolt
Sumner now turned against Grant. Like many other reformers, he decried the corruption in Grant's administration. Sumner believed that the civil rights program he championed could not be carried through by a corrupt government. In 1872, he joined the Liberal Republican Party which had been started by reformist Republicans such as Horace Greeley. The Liberal Republicans supported black suffrage, the three Reconstruction amendments, and the basic civil rights already protected by law, but they also called for amnesty for ex-Confederates and decried the Republican governments in the South elected with the help of black votes, belittled the terrorism of the Ku-Klux Klan, and argued that the time had come to restore "home rule" in the South, which in practical terms meant white Democratic rule. For Sumner's civil rights bill they gave no support at all, but Sumner joined them because he convinced himself that the time had come for reconciliation, and that Democrats were sincere in declaring that they would abide by the Reconstruction settlement.

Conciliation to South
Sumner never saw his support for civil rights as hostile to the South. On the contrary, he had always contended that a guarantee for equality was the one condition essential for true reconciliation. Unlike some other Radical Republicans, he had strongly opposed any hanging or imprisonment of Confederate leaders. In December 1872, he introduced a Senate resolution providing that Civil War battle names should not appear as "battle honors" on the regimental flags of the U.S. Army. The proposal was not new: Sumner had offered a similar resolution on May 8, 1862, and in 1865 he had proposed that no painting hanging in the Capitol portray scenes from the Civil War, because, as he saw it, keeping alive the memories of a war between a people was barbarous. His proposal did not affect the vast majority of battle-flags, as nearly all the regiments that fought had been state regiments, and these were not covered. But Sumner's idea was that any United States regiment, that would in the future enlist southerners as well as northerners, should not carry on its ensigns any insult to those who joined it. His resolution had no chance of passing, but its presentation offended Union army veterans. The Massachusetts legislature censured Sumner for giving "an insult to the loyal soldiery of the nation" and as "meeting the unqualified condemnation of the people of the Commonwealth." Poet John Greenleaf Whittier led an effort to rescind that censure the following year. He succeeded early in 1874 with the help of abolitionist Joshua Bowen Smith, who happened to be serving in the legislature that year. Sumner was able to hear the rescinding resolution presented to the Senate on the last day he was there. He died the following afternoon.

Virginius Affair
On October 30, 1873, the Virginius, a munitions and troop transportation ship supporting the Cuban Rebellion and flying the U.S. flag, was captured by Spanish authorities. After a hasty trial in Santiago, Cuba, Spanish authority executed 53 crew members, including American and British citizens. Although Sumner sympathized with the Cuban rebels and those who were executed by Spanish Republican authority, he refused to support U.S. military intervention or the annexation of Cuba. On November 17, 1873, when located by a reporter, Sumner stated his views in an interview on the Virginius Affair at a local library in Boston. Sumner believed that although the ship was flying a U.S. flag, the mission of the ship was illegal. Sumner, who opposed the Cuban insurgent neutrality of the Grant Administration, believed that the United States needed to support the First Spanish Republic. On November 28, 1873, Secretary of State Hamilton Fish, who coolly handled the incident amidst national outcries for war, negotiated a peaceful settlement with Spanish President Emilio Castelar, and prevented war with Spain.

Death

Long ailing, Charles Sumner died of a heart attack at his home in Washington, D.C., on March 11, 1874, aged 63, after serving nearly 23 years in the Senate. He lay in state at the United States Capitol rotunda, the second senator (Henry Clay being the first, in 1852) and fourth person so honored. At his March 16 burial in Mount Auburn Cemetery in Cambridge, Massachusetts, the pallbearers included Henry Wadsworth Longfellow, Oliver Wendell Holmes, Ralph Waldo Emerson, and John Greenleaf Whittier.

In the aftermath, Mississippi Senator Lucius Lamar's eulogy for Sumner was controversial enough considering his Southern heritage that the incident resulted in Lamar's inclusion in Profiles in Courage.

Historical interpretations
Contemporaries and historians have explored Sumner's personality at length. Sumner's friend Senator Carl Schurz praised Sumner's integrity, his "moral courage," the "sincerity of his convictions," and the "disinterestedness of his motives." However, Sumner's Pulitzer-prize-winning biographer, David Donald, a Southerner, presents Sumner in his first volume, Charles Sumner and the Coming of the Civil War (1960), as an insufferably arrogant moralist; an egoist bloated with pride; pontifical and Olympian, and unable to distinguish between large issues and small ones. Donald concludes that Sumner was a coward who avoided confrontations with his many enemies, whom he routinely insulted in prepared speeches. However, none of his friends at the time doubted his courage, and abolitionist Wendell Phillips, who knew Sumner well, remembered that southerners in the 1850s in Washington wondered, every time Sumner left his house in the morning, whether he would return to it alive. Just before he died, Sumner turned to his friend Ebenezer Rockwood Hoar. "Judge," he said, "tell Emerson how much I love and revere him." "He said of you once," Hoar replied, "that he never knew so white a soul."

Biographers have varied in their appraisal of Sumner. The Pulitzer Prize went to biographer David Donald whose two-volume biography points up Sumner's troubles in dealing with his colleagues:

Moorfield Storey, Sumner's private secretary for two years and subsequent biographer, seeing some of the same qualities, interprets them more charitably:

Sumner's reputation among conservative historians in the first half of the 20th century was largely negative—he was blamed especially for the excesses of Radical Reconstruction, which, in the prevailing scholarship, included letting blacks vote and hold office. Both the Dunning School and the anti-Dunning revisionists were especially negative regarding his performance during Reconstruction.

However, in recent years scholars have emphasized his role as a foremost champion of black rights before, during and after the Civil War; one historian says he was "perhaps the least racist man in America in his day."

Anne-Marie Taylor's biography of Sumner up to 1851 provided a much more sympathetic assessment of a young man, widely respected, conscientious, cultured, courageous, and driven into political prominence by his own sense of duty. Sumner's previously critical biographer David Herbert Donald, in the second volume of his biography, Charles Sumner and the Rights of Man (1970), was much more favorable to Sumner, and though critical, recognized his large contribution to the positive accomplishments of Reconstruction. It has been noted that events in the Civil Rights Movement between 1960, when Donald's first volume was published, and 1970, when the second volume was published, likely swayed Donald somewhat further towards Sumner.

Lawyer David O. Stewart said of him:
 

Ralph Waldo Emerson wrote of Sumner:

In the 2013 film Saving Lincoln, Sumner was portrayed by Creed Bratton. In the 2012 film Lincoln, Sumner is portrayed by actor John Hutton.

Marriage
Sumner was a bachelor for most of his life. In 1866, Sumner began courting Alice Mason Hooper, the widowed daughter-in-law of Massachusetts Representative Samuel Hooper, and the two were married that October. Their marriage was unhappy. Sumner could not respond to his wife's humor, and Alice had a ferocious temper. That winter, Alice began going out to public events with Prussian diplomat Friedrich von Holstein. This caused gossip in Washington, but Alice refused to stop seeing Holstein. When Holstein was recalled to Prussia in the spring of 1867, Alice accused Sumner of engineering the action, which Sumner always denied. They separated the following September. Sumner's enemies used the affair to attack Sumner's manhood, calling Sumner "The Great Impotency." The situation depressed and embarrassed Sumner. He obtained an uncontested divorce on the grounds of desertion on May 10, 1873.

Memorials

The following are named after Charles Sumner:

 Sumner Street in Newton Centre, Massachusetts
 Sumner High School (St. Louis)Opened in 1875, it was the first high school for African Americans west of the Mississippi River.
Charles Sumner Elementary School, Camden, New Jersey
Charles Sumner – Junior High School 65 in New York City;
 Charles Sumner Elementary School in Roslindale, Massachusetts
 Sumner Avenue in Springfield, Massachusetts
 Charles Sumner School and museum in Washington, D.C.
 Sumner Elementary School in Topeka, Kansas, now closed, a school that played a key role in the landmark 1954 case Brown v. Board of Education and is on the National Register of Historic Places
 Charles Sumner Math & Science Community Academy Elementary School in Chicago, Illinois
Sumner Academy of Arts & Science in Kansas City, Kansas
Charles Sumner House, Sumner's home in Boston
Sumner Library in Minneapolis
Sumner County, Kansas
Sumner, Iowa
Sumner, Nebraska
Sumner, Washington
Sumner, Oregon
 Avenida Charles Sumner, Distrito Nacional, Dominican Republic
 Avenue Charles Sumner, Port-au-Prince, Haiti
 Sumner Avenue, Eastvale, California
Sumner Avenue, Schenectady, New York
SS Charles Sumner, a World War II Liberty cargo ship.
Sumner Street in Salem, Massachusetts
 Sumner was sculpted by Edmonia Lewis
 In Barnum's American Museum, there were wax statues of Brooks attacking Sumner (on the floor).
Sumner School, West Virginia
 Sumner Hill and Sumner Hill Road in Stamford, VT

See also

United States Congress members killed or wounded in office
List of civil rights leaders
List of United States Congress members who died in office (1790–1899)
Mary Mildred Williams

Notes

Further reading
 Cohen, Victor H., "Charles Sumner and the Trent Affair", The Journal of Southern History, Vol. 22, No. 2 (May 1956), pp. 205–219 in JSTOR
Donald, David Herbert, Charles Sumner and the Coming of the Civil War (1960)
Paul Goodman, "David Donald's Charles Sumner Reconsidered" in The New England Quarterly, Vol. 37, No. 3. (September 1964), pp. 373–387. online at JSTOR
Gilbert Osofsky, "Cardboard Yankee: How Not to Study the Mind of Charles Sumner", Reviews in American History, Vol. 1, No. 4 (December 1973), pp. 595–606 in JSTOR
 Donald, David Herbert, Charles Sumner and the Rights of Man (1970)
Foner, Eric, Free Soil, Free Labor, Free Men: The Ideology of the Republican Party before the Civil War (1970)
 
Foreman, Amanda, A World on Fire: Britain's Crucial Role in the American Civil War (2011). New York: Penguin Random House.
 Frasure, Carl M. "Charles Sumner and the Rights of the Negro", The Journal of Negro History, Vol. 13, No. 2 (April 1928), pp. 126–149 in JSTOR
 Gienapp, William E., "The Crime against Sumner: The Caning of Charles Sumner and the Rise of the Republican Party." Civil War History 25 (September 1979): 218–45.
Haynes, George Henry, Charles Sumner (1909) online edition
 Hidalgo, Dennis, "Charles Sumner and the Annexation of the Dominican Republic", Itinerario Volume XXI, 2/1997: 51-66
 Hoffer, Williamjames Hull, The Caning of Charles Sumner: Honor, Idealism, and the Origins of the Civil War (Johns Hopkins University Press, 2010)
 Jager, Ronald B., "Charles Sumner, the Constitution, and the Civil Rights Act of 1875", The New England Quarterly, Vol. 42, No. 3 (September 1969), pp. 350–372 in JSTOR
 McCullough, David, The Greater Journey: Americans in Paris (2011)
 Nason, Elias, The Life and Times of Charles Sumner: His Boyhood, Education and Public Career (Boston: B. B. Russell, 1874)
 
 Pfau, Michael William, "Time, Tropes, And Textuality: Reading Republicanism In Charles Sumner's 'Crime Against Kansas.'" Rhetoric & Public Affairs 2003 6(3): 385–413.
 Pierson, Michael D., "'All Southern Society Is Assailed by the Foulest Charges': Charles Sumner's 'The Crime against Kansas' and the Escalation of Republican Anti-Slavery Rhetoric", The New England Quarterly, Vol. 68, No. 4 (December 1995), pp. 531–557 in JSTOR
 Puleo, Stephen, The Caning: The Assault That Drove America to Civil War. Yardley, PA: Westholme Publishing LLC, 2012.  (ebook)
 Ruchames, Louis, "Charles Sumner and American Historiography", Journal of Negro History, Vol. 38, No. 2 (April 1953), pp. 139–160 online at JSTOR
 Sinha, Manisha, "The Caning of Charles Sumner: Slavery, Race, and Ideology in the Age of the Civil War", Journal of the Early Republic 2003 23(2): 233–262. in JSTOR
Storey, Moorfield, Charles Sumner (1900) biography online edition
 Taylor, Anne-Marie, Young Charles Sumner and the Legacy of the American Enlightenment, 1811–1851 (U. of Massachusetts Press, 2001. 422 pp.). Disagrees with Donald and contends that Sumner internalized republican principles of duty, education, and liberty balanced by order. He was also shaped by Moral Philosophy, the dominant strain of American Enlightenment thinking, which included cosmopolitan ideals and a stress on the dignity of intellect and conscience. He was also keen on the idea of Natural Law. These influences came from readings and his close ties to John Quincy Adams, William Ellery Channing, and Joseph Story. Taylor says Sumner sought an American culture combining American liberty with European culture. He became a reformer regarding education, the arts, prison discipline, world peace, and anti-slavery. He saw reform work as a duty to work for the public good.

Primary sources
 
 Palmer, Beverly Wilson, ed. The Selected Letters of Charles Sumner 2 vols. (1990)
 Pierce, Edward L. Memoir and Letters of Charles Sumner 4 vols., 1877–93. online edition
 Sumner, Charles. The Works of Charles Sumner online edition

External links

 Mr. Lincoln and Freedom: Charles Sumner
 Sumner's "Crime Against Kansas" speech
 
 
 
The Liberator Files, Items concerning Charles Sumner from Horace Seldon's collection and summary of research of William Lloyd Garrison's The Liberator original copies at the Boston Public Library, Boston, Massachusetts.
 
 

|-

|-

|-

|-

1811 births
1874 deaths
19th-century American politicians
Abolitionists from Boston
American abolitionists
American people of English descent
Boston Latin School alumni
Burials at Mount Auburn Cemetery
Chairmen of the Senate Committee on Foreign Relations
Harvard Law School alumni
Liberal Republican Party United States senators
Massachusetts Democrats
Massachusetts Free Soilers
Massachusetts Liberal Republicans
Massachusetts Republicans
Members of the American Antiquarian Society
People from Beacon Hill, Boston
People of the Reconstruction Era
People of Massachusetts in the American Civil War
People with traumatic brain injuries
Politicians from Boston
Radical Republicans
Republican Party United States senators from Massachusetts
Sumner family
Union (American Civil War) political leaders
Activists for African-American civil rights